Garage is a clothing store, primarily targeting young women. Founded in 1975 as a subsidiary of Groupe Dynamite, Garage currently has locations in Canada and the United States.

History
1975 – Opening of the first Garage store in Quebec.
1986 – Introduction of a private-label collection.
1999 – National retailer status with a presence in all Canadian provinces.
2004 – Introduction of the New Concept store.
2007 – Opening of the first Garage stores in the United States, starting with eight stores in Maryland, New York, Pennsylvania, New Jersey, Virginia and Florida.

References

External links

 Clothing manufacturer 

Clothing brands
Clothing retailers of Canada
Companies based in Montreal
Retail companies established in 1975
1975 establishments in Quebec
Companies that filed for Chapter 11 bankruptcy in 2020